The men's team foil was one of eight fencing events on the fencing at the 1992 Summer Olympics programme. It was the eighteenth appearance of the event. The competition was held from 5 to 6 August 1992. 59 fencers from 12 nations competed.

Results

Round One

Pool A

Pool B

Pool C

Pool D

Final Round

Rosters

Austria
 Benny Wendt
 Anatol Richter
 Michael Ludwig
 Robert Blaschka
 Merten Mauritz

China
 Ye Chong
 Wang Haibin
 Wang Lihong
 Chen Biao
 Lao Shaopei

Cuba
 Elvis Gregory
 Guillermo Betancourt
 Oscar García
 Tulio Díaz
 Hermenegildo García

France
 Patrick Groc
 Youssef Hocine
 Olivier Lambert
 Patrice Lhôtellier
 Philippe Omnès

Germany
 Udo Wagner
 Ulrich Schreck
 Thorsten Weidner
 Alexander Koch
 Ingo Weißenborn

Great Britain
 Jonathan Davis
 Bill Gosbee
 Donnie McKenzie
 Tony Bartlett

Hungary
 István Busa
 Zsolt Érsek
 Róbert Gátai
 Róbert Kiss
 Zsolt Németh

Italy
 Marco Arpino
 Andrea Borella
 Stefano Cerioni
 Mauro Numa
 Alessandro Puccini

Poland
 Marian Sypniewski
 Piotr Kiełpikowski
 Adam Krzesiński
 Cezary Siess
 Ryszard Sobczak

South Korea
 Kim Yeong-Ho
 Kim Seung-Pyo
 Lee Ho-seong
 Lee Seung-Yong
 Yu Bong-Hyeong

Spain
 Andrés García
 Ramiro Bravo
 José Francisco Guerra
 Andrés Crespo
 Jesús Esperanza

Unified Team
 Dmitry Shevchenko
 Serhiy Holubytskiy
 Vyacheslav Grigoryev
 Anvar Ibragimov
 Ilgar Mamedov

References

Foil team
Men's events at the 1992 Summer Olympics